Los Altares  is a rural commune in Paso de Indios Department, Chubut Province in southern Argentina.  As of 2001, it had 123 inhabitants.  Mario Oviedo is the municipality's leader, with the title Presidente Junta Vecinal.   

Los Altares takes its name from the surrounding rock formations. This terrain is typical of the Patagonian Steppe in central Argentina.  

Near the settlement, there is a site of ancient Tehuelche rock art from the tenth century.  The site is today under the guardianship of the Provincial Cultural Authority.  There is one painting of 90x53 centimeters composed of mineral pigments mixed with organic material.  

The descendants of the native Tehuelches living in the area are artisans.  They will craft arrowheads at visitors' request.

Climate

References

Populated places in Chubut Province
Tourist attractions in Chubut Province   

Archaeological sites in Argentina